Stephen "Steve" Spriggs (born 16 February 1956 in Armthorpe, near Doncaster, England) is a former professional footballer who is mostly remembered for his 12 years at Cambridge United, where he still holds the record for the most appearances with 416.

References 

1956 births
Living people
People from Armthorpe
Footballers from Doncaster
English footballers
Association football midfielders
English Football League players
Huddersfield Town A.F.C. players
Cambridge United F.C. players
Middlesbrough F.C. players